The 2015 Nigerian Senate election in Ogun State held on February 28, 2015, to elect members of the Nigerian Senate to represent Oyo State. Rilwan Akanbi representing Oyo South, Monsurat Sunmonu representing Oyo Central and Abdulfatai Buhari representing Oyo North  all won on the platform of the All Progressives Congress.

Overview

Summary

Results

Oyo Central 
APC candidate Monsurat Sunmonu won the election, defeating PDP candidate Ayoade Ademola.

Oyo South 
APC candidate Rilwan Akanbi won the election, defeating PDP candidate Olarenwaju Otiti and A Party candidate Olufemi Lanlehin.

Oyo North
APC candidate Abdulfatai Buhari won the election, defeating PDP candidate Agboola Ayoola.

References 

February 2015 events in Nigeria
Oyo State Senate elections
Senate, Oyo State